Spilarctia denigrata is a moth in the family Erebidae. It was described by Thomas in 1993. It is found on Sumatra in Indonesia.

References

denigrata
Moths described in 1993